Since 2013, Elvis Duran's Artist of the Month is a regular Today Show feature fronted by American radio broadcaster Elvis Duran in which he chooses an upcoming solo singer, and at times duos and groups, to spotlight them each month as "Artist(s) of the Month". In certain months, two different artists may be featured during the same month.

Duran has his own segment on the 4th hour of NBC's Today show with Kathie Lee Gifford and Hoda Kotb where Duran presents his selected artists, and after a brief interview with the show's hosts, the selected artists sing a recent song of their own for national public audience in the US. Past artists who have appeared on the segment include American bands like A Great Big World, American Authors, Juice, Los 5, MAGIC GIANT, Midnight Red, Ocean Park Standoff, The Revivalists, Saving Forever, the duos Alexander Jean, Jack & Jack, Lion Babe and Secret Weapons, independent and emerging American artists like Madilyn Bailey, Jon Bellion, Cris Cab, Sabrina Carpenter, Greyson Chance, Jessie Chris, Rachel Crow, Rozzi Crane, Daya, Mikky Ekko, Roy English, Emily Estefan, Ferras, Jordan Fisher, Gallant, Todrick Hall, Olivia Holt, Parson James, Lauren Jenkins, Tori Kelly, Austin Mahone, Kirstin Maldonado, Laura Marano, MAX, Bea Miller, Jake Miller, Spencer Sutherland, VÉRITÉ, Tyler Ward, Elle Winter and Zendaya and more.

Although a big majority of the featured artists are American, Duran makes a point of introducing some non-Americans acts as well giving them big exposure in the American markets. Such international artists include Grace, Vance Joy, Conrad Sewell and The Griswolds (Australia), Alessia Cara and Shawn Hook (Canada), Isac Elliot (Finland), AudioDamn! (Germany), Nikki Williams (South Africa), Arlissa, Låpsley, Katy Tiz, Labrinth, Damian McGinty, Aston Merrygold, Tom Walker and the bands MiC LOWRY, New Hope Club (UK) and others.

List of artists

References

External links
Official Elvis Duran's Artist of the Month page
Apple Music Preview - Elvis Duran's Artist of the Month

American music awards
Awards established in 2013